The 2021–22 Handbollsligan was the 88th season of the Swedish Handball League, the top men's handball league in Sweden. A total of fourteen teams contested this season's league, which began on 10 September 2021 and concluded on 27 May 2022.

Ystads IF won their third title.

Teams

Arenas and locations
The following 14 clubs competed in the Handbollsligan during the 2021–22 season:

Regular season

League table

Playoffs
All three rounds of the playoffs were played in a best-of-five format, with the higher seeded team playing the first, third and fifth (if it was necessary) game at home.

Quarterfinals

|}

Semifinals

|}

Finals

|}

Game 1

Game 2

Game 3

Game 4

''Ystads IF won the Finals, 3–1 on series.

Promotion/relegation play-offs
Two legged relegation play-off matches will be played between the teams placed 11th, 12th and 13th at the end of the regular season and the teams placed 2nd, 3rd and 4th at the end of Allsvenskan season. The legs were played in a best-of-five format.

|}

Statistics

Top goalscorers

Awards
The awards were announced on 21 May 2022.

All-Star team
The all-star team was announced on 21 May 2022.

See also
 2021–22 Allsvenskan

References

External links
Official website
Swedish Handball Federation 

Sweden
Handball
Handball
Swedish handball competitions